Noy is Chandrabindoo's ninth and latest studio album. The name is a play on words meaning 9th Chandrabindoo or Not Chandrabindoo.
The band claims to have changed their entire sound / lyrical style for this album to give it a new feel.

Track listing
 Aalo
 Jhilmil Raat
 Aadhkhana Ador
 Ebhabe Jai
 Hridoy
 Muhurtora
 Chup
 Motamuti
 Bishaadbaari Lane
 Ke Nilo Taar Rup

Previously an album "e-Arki" was planned, and 2 tracks "Jani Na" (made available online as a single) and "Puraton Gamchha" were recorded. This project was scrapped and "Noy" was released amongst much fanfare after a gap of 4 years. Chandrabindoo has announced that they will be launching albums every 4th year from now on, as important events like Commonwealth Games, Cricket World Cup, FIFA World Cup and Olympic Games take place every 4 years. This album has been a critical and commercial failure.

Notes

2012 albums
Chandrabindoo (band) albums